James Cowan (born 1952) was the twelfth Anglican Bishop of British Columbia, serving from 2004 to 2013.

Cowan was educated at the University of Saskatchewan and ordained in 1977. He worked in the Diocese of Qu’Appelle for 20 years before coming to British Columbia to be its Diocesan Executive Officer, a post he held until his appointment to the episcopate.

References

1952 births
People from Saskatchewan
University of Saskatchewan alumni
Living people
Anglican bishops of British Columbia
21st-century Anglican Church of Canada bishops